Carrie Messner (born 7 June 1977) is an American long-distance runner who specializes in the 3000 metres steeplechase. Her personal best for the steeplechase is 9:39.68 minutes, set in 2005.

She finished fifteenth at the 2005 World Championships and finished ninth at the 2006 World Athletics Final.

She attended Mullen High School and the University of Colorado Boulder.

Personal bests
1500 metres - 4:13.70 min (2004)
3000 metres steeplechase - 9:39.68 min (2005)
5000 metres -15:47.37 min (2005)

References

USA Track & Field profile

1977 births
Living people
Sportspeople from Colorado
American female long-distance runners
American female steeplechase runners
World Athletics Championships athletes for the United States
21st-century American women